Vlasta Koseová (née Štěpánová, May 21, 1895, in Sedlec, Austria-Hungary – September 29, 1973, in Prague, Czechoslovakia) was the founder of Czech Girl Scouting. In January 1915, the first Girl Scouts were introduced, under her leadership, and shortly thereafter, a Junák section for Guide Education was established. In 1923 she married Dr. Jaroslav Kose, who was executed in 1942 in Brno Kounic college. For her work in Scouting, she received top Junák Girl Scouting honors including Order of the Silver Trefoil.

References

Scouting and Guiding in the Czech Republic
Scouting pioneers
1895 births
1973 deaths